Hypolepis (beadfern) is a genus of ferns described as a genus in 1806. The word is derived from Greek, meaning "under scale". It is found in tropical and subtropical regions, primarily in the New World but also in the Old World and on various oceanic islands.

List of species
, the following species are accepted in the genus as currently circumscribed by the Checklist of Ferns and Lycophytes of the World:

 Hypolepis acantha Schwartsb.
 Hypolepis amaurorachis (Kunze) Hook.
 Hypolepis ambigua (A.Rich.) Brownsey & Chinnock
 Hypolepis aspidioides Christ
 Hypolepis bamleriana Rosenst.
 Hypolepis barringtonii Schwartsb.
 Hypolepis blepharochlaena Mickel & Beitel
 Hypolepis bogotensis H.Karst. ex Mett.
 Hypolepis crassa Maxon
 Hypolepis cubensis Schwartsb.
 Hypolepis dicksonioides (Bory) Hook.
 Hypolepis ditrichomatis R.C.Moran
 Hypolepis ekmanii Maxon
 Hypolepis elegans Carruth.
 Hypolepis feeana Schwartsb.
 Hypolepis fimbriata Maxon ex Proctor
 Hypolepis flexuosa Sodiro
 Hypolepis forzzae Schwartsb.
 Hypolepis galapagensis Schwartsb. & J.Prado
 Hypolepis glabrescens Ching
 Hypolepis glandulosopilosa H.G.Zhou & H.Li
 Hypolepis grandis Lellinger
 Hypolepis guianensis Klotzsch
 Hypolepis hawaiiensis Brownsey
 Hypolepis hostilis (Kunze) C.Presl
 Hypolepis jamaicensis Maxon ex Proctor
 Hypolepis javensis (Willd.) comb.ined., currently known as Hypolepis alpina (Blume) Hook.
 Hypolepis krameri Schwartsb., Boudrie & Cremers
 Hypolepis lellingeri A.Rojas
 Hypolepis malesiana Brownsey
 Hypolepis melanochlaena A.R.Sm.
 Hypolepis microchlaena Mickel & Beitel
 Hypolepis millefolium Hook.
 Hypolepis minima M.Kessler & A.R.Sm.
 Hypolepis miodelii Schwartsb.
 Hypolepis mitis Kunze ex Kuhn
 Hypolepis moraniana A.Rojas
 Hypolepis muelleri Wakef.
 Hypolepis muenchii (Christ) Mickel
 Hypolepis nuda Mett. ex Kuhn
 Hypolepis obtusata (C.Presl) Kuhn
 Hypolepis pallida (Blume) Hook.
 Hypolepis parallelogramma (Kunze) C.Presl
 Hypolepis pedropaloensis Schwartsb. & J.Prado
 Hypolepis periculosa Schwartsb.
 Hypolepis poeppigii (Kunze) R.Rodr.
 Hypolepis polypodioides (Blume) Hook.
 Hypolepis pteroides Mett.
 Hypolepis punctata (Thunb. ex Murray) Mett. ex Kuhn
 Hypolepis repens (L.) C.Presl
 Hypolepis resistens (Kunze) Hook.
 Hypolepis rigescens (Kunze) T.Moore
 Hypolepis rugosula (Labill.) J.Sm.
 Hypolepis scandens M.Kessler & A.R.Sm.
 Hypolepis sparsisora (Schrad.) Kuhn
 Hypolepis stolonifera Fée
 Hypolepis stuebelii Hieron.
 Hypolepis sunduei Schwartsb.
 Hypolepis tenera Ching
 Hypolepis tenerrima Maxon
 Hypolepis tenuifolia (G.Forst.) Bernh.
 Hypolepis thysanochlaena Mickel & Beitel
 Hypolepis trichobacilliformis R.C.Moran
 Hypolepis trichochlaena Mickel & Beitel
 Hypolepis trinationalis Schwartsb.
 Hypolepis urbanii Brause
 Hypolepis viscosa (H.Karst.) Mett.
 Hypolepis woodii Schwartsb.
 Hypolepis zimmerae Schwartsb.
 Hypolepis ×glabra H.Karst. ex Schwartsb. & J.Prado
 Hypolepis ×paulistana Schwartsb. & J.Prado

References

Dennstaedtiaceae
Fern genera